Economidichthys pygmaeus, the Western Greece goby, is a species of freshwater goby endemic to western Greece where it is an inhabitant of streams and rivers.  It is suspected to also occur in Albania.  Males of this species can reach a length of  TL while females can reach a length of  TL.

References

Freshwater fish of Europe
Economidichthys
Fish described in 1929
Endemic fauna of Greece
Taxonomy articles created by Polbot